Mouriki is a former municipality in Kozani regional unit, West Macedonia, Greece. Since the 2011 local government reform it is part of the municipality Eordaia, of which it is a municipal unit. The municipal unit has an area of 112.058 km2. The population in 2011 was 3,909. The seat of the municipality was in Emporio.

References

Populated places in Kozani (regional unit)
Former municipalities in Western Macedonia

bg:Мурик (дем)